Kimberley Ebb (born 6 April 1987) is an Australian rules footballer who played for the Western Bulldogs in the AFL Women's (AFLW). Ebb was drafted by the Western Bulldogs with their fifth selection and thirty-seventh overall in the 2016 AFL Women's draft. She played four matches in her debut season. She was delisted by the Western Bulldogs at the end of the 2018 season.

References

External links 

1987 births
Living people
Western Bulldogs (AFLW) players
Australian rules footballers from Victoria (Australia)
Melbourne University Football Club (VFLW) players